Jozef Bouška (born 25 August 1945) is a Czech former footballer. He competed in the men's tournament at the 1968 Summer Olympics.

References

External links
 
 

1945 births
Living people
Czech footballers
Czechoslovak footballers
Olympic footballers of Czechoslovakia
Footballers at the 1968 Summer Olympics
Sportspeople from Trnava
Association football midfielders
Czech football managers
Czechoslovak football managers
AC Sparta Prague players
FC Zbrojovka Brno players
FC Sellier & Bellot Vlašim players
SK Slavia Prague players
SK Slavia Prague managers
FC Zbrojovka Brno managers